Utricularia platensis is a medium or large-sized perennial suspended aquatic carnivorous plant that belongs to the genus Utricularia. U. platensis is endemic to South America.

See also 
 List of Utricularia species

References 

Carnivorous plants of South America
Flora of Argentina
Flora of Brazil
Flora of Paraguay
Flora of Uruguay
platensis
Taxa named by Carlo Luigi Spegazzini